The Goliath heron (Ardea goliath), also known as the giant heron, is a very large wading bird of the heron family, Ardeidae. It is found in sub-Saharan Africa, with smaller, declining numbers in Southwest and South Asia.

Description

This is the world's largest living heron (the extinct Bennu heron was larger). In flight it has a slow and rather ponderous look and, unlike some other herons, its legs are not held horizontally. Male and female look similar, with an overall covering of slate gray and chestnut feathers. The head and its bushy crest, face, back and sides of the neck are chestnut. The chin, throat, foreneck and upper breast are white, with black streaks across the foreneck and upper breast. The lower breast and belly are buff with black streaks. The back and upper wings are slate-grey, with a chestnut shoulder patch at the bend of the wings when they're closed. The under-wing is pale chestnut. The upper mandible is black and the lores and orbital areas are yellow with a greenish tinge. The eyes are yellow while the legs and feet are black. Juveniles look similar to adults, but are paler. The only heron with somewhat similarly-colorful plumage characteristics, the widespread purple heron, is much smaller than the Goliath. Despite the shared plumage characteristics with the purple species, the closest extant relatives of the Goliath are considered to be the great-billed and the white-bellied herons of Southern Asia. Due to their large size, this species trio is sometimes referred to as the "giant herons".

The Goliath heron has a distinct deep bark, often described as kowoork, audible from a distances of up to 2 km. A disturbance call (arrk), sharper and higher, can also occasionally be heard. A huh-huh is given during the crouched stage, while a krooo may be heard with the neck extended. Organ-like duetting has been reported at nest sites but has not been confirmed.

Habitat
The Goliath heron is very aquatic, even by heron standards, rarely venturing far from a water source and preferring to fly along waterways rather than move over land. Important habitats can include lakes, swamps, mangrove wetlands, reefs with few cool water, sometimes river deltas. It typically is found in shallows, though can be observed near deep water over dense water vegetation. Goliath herons can even be found in small watering holes. They tend to prefer pristine wetlands and generally avoid areas where human disturbances are a regular occurrence.

Diet and behaviour

Goliath herons are solitary foragers and are highly territorial towards other Goliaths entering their feeding territories. On occasions, two may be seen together but these are most likely to be a breeding pair or immatures. A diurnal and often rather inactive feeder, this heron often hunts by standing in the shallows, intently watching the water at its feet. This is a typical feeding method among large Ardea herons and it can forage in deeper waters than most due to its larger size. It may also perch on heavy floating vegetation, in order to prevent water from rippling around them. As prey appears, the heron rapidly spears it with open mandibles, often spearing both mandibles through the fish's body, and then swallows it whole. It is possible that the bill is used in a lure-like fashion occasionally, attracting fish to the immobile, large object submerged in the water. The handling period is long, with herons often placing their struggling prey on floating vegetation while preparing to swallow it. Due to its generally slow movements and handling time, the Goliath is frequently vulnerable to kleptoparasitism. In Africa, African fish eagles frequently pirate food caught by Goliaths, although other large birds such as saddle-billed storks and pelicans may also steal their prey.

Prey almost entirely consists of fish. Fish exceeding  are usually rejected, though there is a report that the heron managed to swallow  fish. Small fish are generally ignored and the average Goliath catches around 2 or 3 fish a day. Breams, mullet, tilapia and carp have locally been recorded as preferred species. Any other small animals that they come across may be eaten, including frogs, prawns, small mammals, lizards, snakes, insects and even carrion.

Breeding

Its breeding season coincides generally with the start of the rainy season, which is around November to March. In some areas, breeding is year around, with no discernable peak season. Breeding may not occur every year. Fairly adaptable in their nesting site selection, Goliath herons generally prefer to nest on islands or islands of vegetation. The birds may abandon a nesting site if the island becomes attached to the mainland. Lakes or other large bodies of water usually hold colonies. They nest fairly low in variously sedge, reeds, bushes, trees or even on rocks or large tree stumps. The nesting dispersal seems highly variable as everything from a solitary pair (with no other Goliath nests anywhere near) to fairly large colonies have been observed, with no seeming local geographical preferences. Occasionally, they may join mixed-species colonies including other heron species, cormorants, darters, ibises and gulls. The breeding displays are not well known and may be subdued, due in part to breeding pairs possibly reunited year after year.

The clutch size can range from 2 to 5 (usually 3 or 4). Incubation lasts 24 to 30 days. Although they can sometimes replace clutches, often only around 25% of eggs succeed in hatching due to various environmental conditions or predation. The young are fed by regurgitation in the nest and, after a few weeks, can bill jab and practice defensive postures against each other. At around five weeks they leave the nest completely. The parents continue to tend to them for variously 40 to 80 days. Around 62% of fledglings who successfully leave the nest survive to adulthood. Locally, the white-tailed eagle and the African fish eagle may be a predator in colonies. Despite their ponderous movements, Goliath herons can think quickly and often take flight before danger approaches. Also, due to its size and formidable bill, the full-grown Goliath heron may not have any regular predators.

References

Bibliography

External links
Heron Conservation- Goliath heron species profile
 Goliath heron – Species text in The Atlas of Southern African Birds

Goliath heron
Goliath heron
Birds of the Middle East
Birds of Sub-Saharan Africa
Birds of India
Goliath heron
Goliath heron